Braedan Jason (born 15 May 1998) is an Australian Paralympic swimmer.  He represented Australia at the 2016 Rio Paralympics and the 2020 Tokyo Paralympics.

Personal
Jason was born on 15  May 1998 in Cronulla, New South Wales. He is the second oldest of four boys. He was born with cone dystrophy resulting in him having ten per cent vision and classed as being legally blind. His brother Nathan also has the same condition. 
He has attended St Joseph's College, Nudgee in Queensland.

Sporting career
Jason began swimming at the age of eight. He started as  a nipper at North Cronulla Surf Life Saving Club. He continued his surf life saving at Alexandra Headlands Club. In 2015,he finished ninth-place finish in a field of 15 at the 2015 Australian Surf Life Saving Championships. He is also a pool swimmer.  In 2012, he won silver medal at the age national swimming championships.
In April 2015, Jason competed at the Australian Swimming Championships where the able-bodied and paralympic team were combined. He then went on to compete at the 2015 IPC Swimming World Championships where he came fifth in the Men's 50m and 400m freestyle S13 and sixth Men's 100m Freestyle S13 and seventh in the Men's 100m Butterfly S13.

Jason competed at the 2016 Rio Paralympics in four events. He placed sixth in Men's 50m Freestyle S13, seventh in Men's 100m Freestyle S14, fifth in Men's 400m Freestyle S13 and seventh in Men's 100m Butterfly S13.

At the 2019 World Para Swimming Championships in London, he swam in five events and his best placing was fourth in the  Men's 400m Freestyle (S13) and broke Oceania records in Men's 100m Butterfly (S12) and  Men's 100m Freestyle (S12).

At the 2020 Tokyo Paralympics, he finished fourth in the Men's 400 m freestyle S13, fifth in the Men's 100 m freestyle S12 and sixth in the Men's 100 m butterfly S12.

At the 2022 Birmingham Commonwealth Games, he finished 4th in the Men's 50 m Freestyle S13. 

He was coached by Jan Cameron at the University of the Sunshine Coast in Sippy Downs, Queensland. Since 2021, he has been coached by Nathan Doyle.

References

External links

 
 
 

1998 births
Living people
Male Paralympic swimmers of Australia
Swimmers at the 2016 Summer Paralympics
Swimmers at the 2020 Summer Paralympics
Swimmers at the 2022 Commonwealth Games
Commonwealth Games competitors for Australia
Visually impaired category Paralympic competitors
Sportsmen from Queensland
S13-classified Paralympic swimmers
Australian blind people
20th-century Australian people
21st-century Australian people